The women's 1500 metres at the 2016 European Athletics Championships took place at the Olympic Stadium from 8 and 10 July.

Records

Schedule

Results

Round 1

First 4 in each heat (Q) and 4 best performers (q) advance to the Semifinals.

Final

References

External links
 amsterdam2016.org, official championship site.

1500 W
1500 metres at the European Athletics Championships
2016 in women's athletics